Nuverz is a Miami-based company focused on developing content to help older adults live longer and independent lives.

According to Diario de Las Americas, the company is part of the growing Aging in Place movement. The trend promotes the idea that people should “live in one's own home and community safely, independently, and comfortably, regardless of age, income, or ability level.” According to the expert Michael Saunders, Nuverz is considered a reference for designers in this area.

Platforms 

The company publishes a Q&A site called Nuverz Answers, where users ask questions and offer answers on issues related to Aging-in-Place and aging in general. Their other platform, Nuverz Advice, contains articles by Ageist founder, David Harry Stewart.

Founders  

Among the founders is entrepreneur Sonia Gil. The founding Editor-in-Chief for all the company’s content is Lucero Uribe.

References 

Internet properties established in 2016
Housing for the elderly in the United States
Medical technology companies of the United States